The Lost Saucer is an ABC network television series produced by Sid and Marty Krofft, starring Ruth Buzzi and Jim Nabors as hapless aliens who take a boy and his babysitter with them on their flying saucer. It aired new episodes from September to December 1975, with reruns continuing until December 1976, first under its own banner, then as part of The Krofft Supershow. It ran in daily syndication from 1978 to 1985 as part of the "Krofft Superstars" package with six other Krofft series.

Premise
The Lost Saucer was about two friendly time-travelling androids from the year 2369 named Fi (Ruth Buzzi) and Fum (Jim Nabors) who land their flying saucer on present-day (1975) Earth. They good-naturedly invite a young boy named Jerry (Jarrod Johnson) and his babysitter Alice (Alice Playten) to check out the interior of their craft.

As onlookers begin to gather though, the two androids become nervous about attracting attention and abruptly take off with Jerry and Alice. The flying saucer has the ability to travel through time, but the controls which allow the androids to specify an exact date were damaged, thus preventing the androids from returning Jerry and Alice to their rightful time and place.

The series follows the foursome as the two androids (who bicker and argue incessantly with each other, neither seeming competent with the ship's controls) encounter various adventures while trying to get Jerry and Alice back home or return to their own home on planet ZR-3 where they hoped to make repairs with the help of their lookalike creators Doctor Locker (Nabors) and Professor Pringle (Buzzi dressed as her purse-wielding spinster character Gladys from Laugh-In).

The adventures are usually set on Earth (or an Earth colony) either in the distant past or in the distant future hundreds (or even thousands) of years hence. Typically, episodes were blatant social commentaries dealing with extremes such as a world where names (and faces) were replaced with numbers, where machines were outlawed due to a global energy shortage, or a city where the population had grown lazy and obese because robots do all the physical work.

Accompanying them on their adventures was a creature known as the Dorse (played by Larry Larsen) which was a half-dog, half-horse hybrid with the body of a large shaggy dog and the head of a small horse.

There were 16 original episodes produced for the 1975–76 season. The first six episodes were later rerun in the first half of The Krofft Supershow'''s first season.

Themes
Each episode had a specific theme, usually a social or environmental one. "Fat Is Beautiful", for example, depicted a future in which people were grotesquely obese due to over-dependence on push-button conveniences, and leanness was in fact outlawed. In "Get a Dorse", two scientists kidnap the Dorse to use as a power source because the world's fuel supplies were finally used up.

Episodes

References

External links
 
 
 The Lost Saucer'' at Episodate.com

American children's adventure television series
1970s American children's comedy television series
1970s American comic science fiction television series
American Broadcasting Company original programming
1975 American television series debuts
1976 American television series endings
Androids in television
Television series about robots
Space adventure television series
American children's science fiction television series
American television shows featuring puppetry
American time travel television series
Television series by Sid and Marty Krofft Television Productions
Television series by CBS Studios
Fiction set in the 24th century
1970s American time travel television series